All I Ever Wanted: The Anthology is a two-disc compilation by the British singer and songwriter Kirsty MacColl, released by Salvo in 2014. The set contains 43 tracks from across MacColl's career and a 32-page booklet.

Critical reception

Upon release, Mark Deming of AllMusic described MacColl's songwriting as "witty, disarmingly honest, eclectic, and adventurous", and added: "All I Ever Wanted is a suitably thorough and tremendously entertaining look at an artist who left behind a small but impressive legacy." The compilation was also included on AllMusic's "Favorite Compilations" list as part of their "Best of 2014". Andy Gill of The Independent considered MacColl "[the] most English of talents" and noted her "winning blend of strength and fragility, vocally and lyrically".

Track listing

Disc one

Disc two

References

2014 compilation albums
Kirsty MacColl albums